The Treaties of Peace of Nijmegen were a series of treaties signed in the Dutch city of Nijmegen between August 1678 and October 1679. The treaties ended various interconnected wars among France, the Dutch Republic, Spain, Brandenburg, Sweden, Denmark-Norway, the Prince-Bishopric of Münster, and the Holy Roman Empire. The most significant of the treaties was the first, which established peace between France and the Dutch Republic and placed the northern border of France very near its modern position.

Background
The Franco-Dutch War of 1672–78 was the source of all the other wars that were ended formally at Nijmegen. Separate peace treaties were arranged for conflicts like the Third Anglo-Dutch War and the Scanian War, but all of them had been directly caused by and form part of the Franco-Dutch War. England initially participated in the war on the French side but withdrew in 1674, after the Treaty of Westminster. The Electorate of Cologne left the war in 1674, while the Prince-Bishopric of Münster switched sides from France to join the anti-French coalition that year. Denmark-Norway also joined the anti-French side in 1675, primarily fighting against Sweden.

At the end of the Franco-Dutch and Scanian Wars, these were the belligerents:

Anti-French coalition
  Dutch Republic
  Spanish Empire (including Spanish Netherlands)
  Denmark-Norway
  Holy Roman Empire:
  Brandenburg-Prussia
  Prince-Bishopric of Münster
  Principality of Lüneburg (Celle)
  Duchy of Lorraine
 and others

France and allies
  Kingdom of France
  Kingdom of Sweden

Treaties 
Peace negotiations had begun as early as 1676, but nothing was agreed to and signed before 1678. Most treaties were concluded in Nijmegen, therefore the sum of all documents is known as the 'Treaties of Nijmegen'. Some of the countries involved signed peace deals elsewhere, such as the Treaty of Celle (Sweden made peace with Lüneburg (Celle)), Treaty of Saint-Germain (France and Sweden made peace with Brandenburg) and Treaty of Fontainebleau (France dictated peace between Sweden and Denmark-Norway).

Terms

The Franco–Dutch War ended with a treaty which gave France control over the region of the Franche-Comté. France also gained further territories of the Spanish Netherlands, adding to those it had annexed under the 1659 Peace of the Pyrenees and 1668 Treaty of Aix-la-Chapelle. These included the town of Saint-Omer with the remaining northwestern part of the former Imperial County of Artois; the lands of Cassel, Aire and Ypres in southwestern Flanders; the Bishopric of Cambrai; and the towns of Valenciennes and Maubeuge in the southern County of Hainaut.

In turn, French King Louis XIV ceded the occupied town of Maastricht and the Principality of Orange to the Dutch stadtholder William III. The French forces withdrew from several occupied territories in northern Flanders and Hainaut.

Emperor Leopold I retained the captured fortress of Philippsburg but had to accept the French occupation of the towns of Freiburg (until 1697) and Kehl (until 1698) on the right bank of the Rhine.

The treaties did not result in a lasting peace.

Culture
Marc-Antoine Charpentier wrote a Te Deum for this occasion. The prelude of the Te Deum is also known as the Eurovision Song Contest theme.

See also
 Louis XIV Victory Monument

References

External links

 Scan of the Franco-Dutch treaty (10 Aug 1678, in French, IEG Mainz)

1678 treaties
1679 treaties
1678 in Europe
1679 in Europe
Peace treaties of the Ancien Régime
Nijmegen, Treaties of
Peace treaties of Spain
Peace treaties of Denmark
Nijmegen
Treaties of the Swedish Empire
Treaties of the Margraviate of Brandenburg
Treaties of the Spanish Empire
1678 in the Dutch Republic
1679 in the Dutch Republic
1678 in France
1679 in France
1678 in Spain
1679 in Sweden
1678 in the Holy Roman Empire
1679 in the Holy Roman Empire
History of Nijmegen
Leopold I, Holy Roman Emperor
Louis XIV
William III of England
Franco-Dutch War